Interlake-Gimli is a provincial electoral district in the Canadian province of Manitoba that came into effect at the 2019 Manitoba general election. It will elect one member to the Legislative Assembly of Manitoba.

The riding was created by the 2018 provincial redistribution out of parts of Interlake, Gimli, Lakeside, and a small part of Swan River.

Election results

2019 general election

References

Manitoba provincial electoral districts